Men's Slalom World Cup 2005/2006

Calendar

Final point standings

In Men's Slalom World Cup 2005/06 all results count.

Note:

In the last race only the best racers were allowed to compete and only the best 15 finishers were awarded with points.

Men's Slalom Team Results

bold = highest score italics = race wins

References
 fis-ski.com

World Cup
FIS Alpine Ski World Cup slalom men's discipline titles